Eve and the Serpent (French: Ève et le serpent) is a 1949 French comedy film directed by Charles-Félix Tavano and starring Gaby Morlay, Félix Oudart and Jacqueline Gauthier.

Cast
 Gaby Morlay as Laurence Barrois 
 Félix Oudart as Monsieur Grombat 
 Jacqueline Gauthier as Louisette 
 Robert Moncade as Georges 
 Marguerite Deval as Madame Béchut 
 Jean Lanier as Le notaire 
 Eliane Saint-Jean as Suzon 
 Albert Michel as Le valet de chambre 
 Hélène Garaud as Madame Ancelin 
 Raymond Pélissier as L'impresario 
 Palmyre Levasseur as Marinette 
 Suzanne Nivette as Madame Léonie 
 Antonin Baryel as Le domestique

References

Bibliography 
 Dayna Oscherwitz & MaryEllen Higgins. The A to Z of French Cinema. Scarecrow Press, 2009.

External links 
 

1949 films
French comedy films
1949 comedy films
1940s French-language films
Films directed by Charles-Félix Tavano
French black-and-white films
1940s French films